Woodland High School is a public high school located at 800 N. Moseley Drive in Stockbridge, Georgia, United States. The school's teams are known as the Wolfpack.

Notable alumni 

 Shakur Brown (class of 2017), NFL athlete
 Yusuf Corker (class of 2017), NFL athlete
 Chase Akin (class of 2017), Twitter personality

References

Educational institutions established in 2007
2007 establishments in Georgia (U.S. state)
Public high schools in Georgia (U.S. state)
Schools in Henry County, Georgia
Stockbridge, Georgia